Y.R.N. (Young Rich Niggas) is the third mixtape by American hip hop group Migos. It was released on June 13, 2013. The album features notable guest appearances from rappers Gucci Mane, Trinidad James, Riff Raff and Soulja Boy. This mixtape is notable for the single "Versace", the single reached number 99 on the US Billboard Hot 100 chart, number 31 on the US Hot R&B/Hip-Hop Songs chart, number 23 on the US Hot Rap Songs chart and number 11 on the US Top Heatseekers chart. "Versace" was placed in multiple year-end lists of 2013. Diplo included it in his 2013 round-up set on BBC Radio 1. XXL named it one of the top five hip hop songs of 2013. The official music video, directed by Gabriel Hart, was released on September 30, 2013. It shows Migos and Zaytoven at a luxurious mansion, wearing Versace clothes and accessories. The video also features a snippet of Migos second single off the mixtape "Hannah Montana". As of April 2021, it has gained over 36 million views on YouTube. Y.R.N. later reached number 74 on the US Top R&B/Hip-Hop Albums chart, their first mixtape to do so on the Billboard charts. The mixtape was premiered on LiveMixtapes.com, on 06/13/2013 and has over 7 million views and 500,000 downloads.  Offset only appears on some of the tracks, he was incarcerated in 2013 when Y.R.N. (Young Rich Niggas) came out.

Critical reception

Y.R.N. received favorable reviews from critics and was ranked as the third best mixtape of 2013 by Rolling Stone.

Track listing

Charts

References

2013 mixtape albums
Albums produced by Zaytoven
Migos albums
Quality Control Music albums